The Original Chico Hamilton Quintet is a live album by drummer and bandleader Chico Hamilton's Quintet featuring multi-instrumentalist Buddy Collette recorded in 1955 but not released on the World Pacific label until 1960.

Reception

Allmusic awarded the album 3 stars.

Track listing
 "Caravan" (Duke Ellington, Irving Mills, Juan Tizol) - 6:05
 "Tea for Two" (Vincent Youmans, Irving Caesar) - 5:34
 "Fast Flute" (Buddy Collette, Chico Hamilton) - 6:00
 "Change It" (Collette) - 2:37
 "Cute Little Deal" (Jo Jones) - 2:55
 "A Mood" (Fred Katz) - 3:51
 "This Is Your Day" (Collette) - 3:54
 "I'll Keep Loving You" (Bud Powell) - 2:15
 "Crazy Rhythm" (Roger Wolfe Kahn, Joseph Meyer, Irving Caesar) - 4:13

Personnel
Chico Hamilton - drums
Buddy Collette - tenor saxophone, alto saxophone, flute, clarinet
Fred Katz - cello
Jim Hall - guitar
Carson Smith - bass

References 

World Pacific Records live albums
Chico Hamilton live albums
1960 live albums